Bullers Green is a part of the town of Morpeth and former civil parish, Northumberland, England. In 1881 the parish had a population of 346.

Governance 
Bullers Green is in the parliamentary constituency of Berwick-upon-Tweed. Bullers Green was formerly a township in Morpeth parish, from 1866 Bullers Green was a civil parish in its own right until it was abolished on 1 April 1888 and merged with Morpeth and Newminster Abbey.

Notable residents
Bullers Green was the birthplace of Robert Morrison (1782–1834), the first Protestant missionary to China

References

Former civil parishes in Northumberland
Morpeth, Northumberland